The Chyron Corporation, formerly ChyronHego Corporation, headquartered in Melville, New York, is a company that specializes in broadcast graphics creation, playout, and real-time data visualization for live television, news, weather, and sports production. Chyron's graphics offerings include hosted services for graphics creation and order management, on-air graphics systems, channel branding, weather graphics, graphics asset management, clip servers, social media and second screen applications, touchscreen graphics, telestration, virtual graphics, and player tracking.

The company was founded in 1966 as Systems Resources Corporation. In its early days it was renamed "Chiron" after the centaur Chiron in Greek mythology. In the 1970s it pioneered the development of broadcast titling and graphics systems. Use of its graphics generators by the major New York City–based US television networks ABC, NBC, and eventually CBS, integrated text and graphics into news and sports coverage on broadcast television and later on cable TV. 

By the 1980s, Chyron had captured a 70% market share in its field. In it was the most profitable company on Long Island. In 1983 it achieved a market capitalization of $112 million, high at the time for a small high-tech firm before the age of dot-com and the Internet.

Corporate history
Chyron's graphics generator technology was originated by Systems Resources Corporation, founded in 1966 by Francis Mechner and engineer Eugene Leonard as equal partners and sole directors and shareholders. Mechner had just sold his educational technology company Basic Systems, Inc. to Xerox Corporation; and Leonard had sold Digitronics Corporation, of which he was president. Mechner and Leonard previously worked together in the late 1950s at Schering Corporation, creating a computerized data collection and analysis system for its behavioral psychopharmacology laboratory.

Mechner provided the capital for Systems Resources Corporation's first five years of operation and Leonard provided his engineering expertise. Between 1966 and 1972, the company developed several innovative digital technology-based products, including a digital graphics generator for displaying letters on a television screen, which it called "Chiron" after the centaur Chiron in Greek mythology. The device controlled the edging of the displayed characters in a manner that took background variables into account.

In 1972, the company hired Joseph L. Scheuer as its vice president of operations (he was an engineer at Leonard's Digitronics). From 1971 to 1978, Eugene Leonard was the company's president, and also directed engineering. The Chiron I, Chiron II and Chiron III character generator families were developed during this time, with conceptual design entirely by Leonard.

In 1975, Systems Resources Corporation merged with Computer Exchange, a used-computer brokerage owned by engineer Leon Weissman, who had also worked for Leonard at Digitronics (Director of Engineering, 1962–1964). Weissman's company had cash but its business was in a slump. The merger provided SRC with funding beyond Mechner's contributions. The merged company, Chiron, was located in Plainview, New York, only a few miles from its present Melville location.

Leon Weissman placed emphasis on sales and field service starting the company on a decade of increasingly profitable operations. Differences emerged between Leonard and Weissman with the former wanting to use more of the profits earned for engineering development of even more sophisticated products. Weissman was more cautious about the early introduction of new products wanting to accumulate working capital and eventually make some distributions to shareholders.
These differences led to the departure of Eugene Leonard from the company in 1978. Joseph Scheuer became president and Leon Weissman became chairman and CEO.

In 1983, Leon Weissman turned over his positions as chairman and CEO to Alfred O.P. Leubert. The company continued profitably for some years. Acquisitions were made in order to increase sales. Acquiring companies such as CMX Editing Systems and Aurora Systems did not prove to be profitable in the long run; so much so that in 1991 the company filed for bankruptcy and reorganization. In 1995, new owners took control of the company and appointed Michael I. Wellesley-Wesly as chairman and CEO.

In the 1990s and 2000s, Chyron Corporation continued being successful in its core business, but profitability and stock market success never returned to the glory days of the early 1980s.

In May 2013, Chyron Corporation merged with Sweden-based company Hego AB and its subsidiaries (collectively, "Hego Group"), a leading provider of graphics and data visualization solutions for TV and sports. The combined company was rebranded as ChyronHego and is headquartered in Melville, New York, with offices in Czech Republic, Denmark, Finland, Germany, Mexico, Norway, Singapore, Slovak Republic, Sweden, and the United Kingdom.

In 2015, the private equity firm Vector Capital bought ChyronHego for $120 million.  The stock of the company, which previously traded on the NASDAQ Global Market under the symbol CHYR, was delisted.

In February 2021, ChyronHego announced that the company will return to its former name Chyron, relegating Hego and Tracab to "sub-brands".

Product development and history

Systems Resources Corporation began manufacturing dot-matrix (5×7) character generators (CG) for airport arrival and departure time displays. It also began manufacturing a clean-looking fixed-font (ROM-based) CG sold as the Chiron I. It featured the ability to record and retrieve lower thirds and full page text displays for news departments of TV stations as an alternative to art cards, slides or scrolling black felt.

The company built its own multi-track magnetic storage device, the VidiLoop, based on a two-foot loop of computer tape in a thick clear plastic housing. On the Chiron I, it was used solely for title storage. It was also used on a few early Chiron IIs, but due to increased storage requirements it was replaced by Shugart SA901 8" floppy drives as soon as they were available.

The name Chiron was already registered in California, so by changing the I to a Y in the 1970s they were able to keep the familiar-sounding name and became initially Chyron Telesystems and, later still, Chyron Corporation, capitalizing on the product's name recognition.

The Chiron II featured up to six loadable fonts (typefaces) with, for the time, very high video resolution. The display circuits were running so fast (27 ns) that the fastest ICs available were used and had to be hand selected during manufacture as not all samples were up to par.

It was also the company's first unit to incorporate a 16-bit mini-computer known as the DataMate-70. That processor's code base was used in the Chiron IV and 4100 series systems, which were the workhorses of the mobile sports graphics industry from the late 1970s through most of the 1980s. Programs and fonts were loaded from loop or disk into computer style magnetic core memory. As the font data access needed to be done more quickly than a single core memory could achieve, four core boards were used in parallel to provide faster access. It was also the first CG that had non-monospaced fonts with adjustable inter-row and inter-character spacing.

All of that capability came at a cost too dear for many small market TV stations and so a spin-off of a project for NBC became the Chiron III (later IIIB); a less capable system that was adequate for many TV news departments was developed and sold. It became the first mobile graphics systems of ABC Sports under Roone Arledge. It was he who pushed the increased use of graphics in sports to what it is today—a significant portion of live sports entertainment. The III's success provided the impetus for the Chiron IV, which was a modernized and reduced-package-size Chiron II suitable for mobile use. It quickly replaced the Chiron IIIs as the dominant sports graphics system. In 1989, Chyron released the iNFiNiT!, with the related Max!, and Maxine! coming later in the 90s.

Chyron grew into the leading hardware manufacturer and software designer of 2D and 3D broadcast character generators in North America.

As generic reference
"Lower third" television graphics created by character generators are sometimes generically called chyrons (a form of genericized trademark) regardless of who made them.

References

External links
 
 "First-Hand: Inventing the Vidifont: the first electronics graphics machine used in television production" (2008)

1966 establishments in New York (state)
American companies established in 1966
Companies based in Suffolk County, New York
Electronics companies established in 1966
Electronics companies of the United States
Mass media companies established in 1966
Television technology
Video equipment manufacturers